Rodrigo Fabián Núñez Ortiz (born 5 February 1977) is a Chilean football former midfielder.

International career
He made his debut for the Chile national football team on February 9, 2000. He obtained a total number of six caps for his native country and was a member of the bronze winning squad at the 2000 Summer Olympics in Sydney, Australia.

Honours

Club
Santiago Wanderers
 Primera División de Chile (1): 2001

International
 Olympic Games Bronze Medal: 2000 Sydney

References

1977 births
Living people
Chilean footballers
Chile international footballers
Olympic footballers of Chile
Footballers at the 2000 Summer Olympics
Olympic bronze medalists for Chile
2001 Copa América players
Footballers from Santiago
Cobresal footballers
Deportes Iquique footballers
Santiago Wanderers footballers
C.D. Antofagasta footballers
Rangers de Talca footballers
Olympic medalists in football
Association football midfielders
Medalists at the 2000 Summer Olympics